Claudelands railway station was a New Zealand railway station in the Hamilton suburb of Claudelands.

History 
Claudelands had a railway station from 1884 to 1991, named Hamilton East until 1 March 1899, and then Kirikiriroa until 1 February 1914, when it was changed to Claudelands after a petition.

The station was between Brooklyn Road and Claudelands Road.

By 1884 the station had a goods shed and cattle pens. In 1912, the Hamilton Chamber of Commerce applied for a porter to be employed there, which was approved in 1913, when it became a tablet station and the yard was extended, after a lengthy residents' campaign. A  x  goods shed was built in 1925 and electric lighting added by 1927. Railway houses were built in 1920, 1954 and 1955. The station building was damaged by fire on 23 April 1949 and burnt down on 11 July 1987, though there is a photograph of the station captioned as 25 June 1988. The stockyards closed on 12 May 1969 and the station closed on 2 June 1991.

In 2020, double tracking and potentially reopening the station for events, were put forward as a COVID-19 recovery scheme, as part of a $150m scheme to relay tracks to Cambridge.

References

Hamilton, New Zealand
Rail transport in Waikato
Railway stations opened in 1884
Railway stations closed in 1991
Defunct railway stations in New Zealand
Buildings and structures in Hamilton, New Zealand
1884 establishments in New Zealand